Avena sterilis (animated oat, sterile oat, wild oat, wild red oat, winter wild oat; syn. Avena ludoviciana Durieu; Avena sterilis ssp. ludoviciana (Durieu) Gillet & Magne in Federal Noxious Weed Disseminules of the U.S.) is a species of grass weed whose seeds are edible.

Distribution
Avena sterilis is native to the Mediterranean Basin and West, Central and South Asia, but is widely naturalized elsewhere.

As a weed

Herbicide resistance
Avena sterilis ssp. ludoviciana with multiple herbicide resistance - at 2 SOAs - was first observed in Kermanshah, Khuzestan, Iran, in winter wheat cultivation in 2010. These populations are known to be resistant to clodinafop-propargyl, iodosulfuron-methyl-sodium, and mesosulfuron-methyl. Resistance in Asl (and Avena fatua) to fenoxaprop‐P‐ethyl has evolved in several fields in England. Although these Asl and A. fatua are also hybridising, it remains unproven if this is why they both have resistance, or in which direction this has occurred. A. sterilis populations in Greece are almost all resistant to diclofop but susceptible to most other herbicides, including others of the same MOA (i.e., AACase inhibitors). However, most Greek populations do have diclofop resistance and some other resistance to at least one other herbicide.

References

External links
Federal Noxious Weed Disseminules of the U.S.: Avena sterilis
Plants For A Future: Avena sterilis
ScienceDirect: Avena sterilis

sterilis
Flora of Lebanon
Flora of Malta